As of the 2023 Australian Open;
 480 men's singles Grand Slam championships have been played since 1877.
 152 different players have won a men's singles Grand Slam championship; they are listed here in order of their first win. Players in bold are still active.

See also
List of Grand Slam men's singles champions
Chronological list of women's Grand Slam tennis champions
List of Grand Slam men's singles finals
Major professional tennis tournaments before the Open Era
List of ATP Tour top-level tournament singles champions

Lists of male tennis players
Lists of Grand Slam (tennis) champions